Braaten is a Norwegian surname. Notable people with the surname include:

Daniel Braaten (born 1982), Norwegian footballer
Oskar Braaten, (1881–1939) Norwegian novelist
Carl Braaten (born 1929), American theologist
Kenneth Braaten (born 1974), Norwegian skier
Vegard Braaten (born 1987), Norwegian footballer
Josh Braaten (born 1977), American actor
Paul Braaten, (1876–1963) Norwegian skier

Norwegian-language surnames